One Planet International School is an international school located in Addis Ababa, Ethiopia.   At the kindergarten level, it offers Lower Kindergarten (Age 3-4), Upper Kindergarten (Age 4-5), and Preparatory (Age 5-6).   At the primary level, grades one through eight are offered.  At the secondary level, grades nine and twelve are offered.

Curriculum
Accredited by the Ethiopian Ministry of Education as private school, the school's curriculum uses international standard, research-based curriculum and teaching methods.  Instruction is in English and Amharic languages.

There is also a curriculum of virtues based on The Virtues Project.

Donors sponsor scholarships including the Hidden Gems Scholarship Fund for orphaned and street girls with a one-year scholarship which includes funds for tuition and materials.

History

See also 

Schools in Ethiopia

References

External links
Official Website

Educational institutions established in 2006
International schools in Ethiopia
2006 establishments in Ethiopia